I Love You is a 2007 Indian Bengali romantic drama film by Ravi Kinagi. This movie is a remake of the Telugu film Nuvvostanante Nenoddantana. It was a Shree Venkatesh Films production. The rural scenes shown in this movie were filmed in the original location and set where the Telugu film was filmed at a village near Araku in Andhra Pradesh .

Plot
Rahul (Dev) is a rich, city boy, born to billionaire parents and brought up in Kolkata. On the other hand, Puja (Payel Sarkar)is a traditional, simple desi girl, from a village of West Bengal who is brought up by her only brother, Indra (Tapas Paul). He is heartbroken when their father marries another woman and throws them out of the house, humiliating them on the way. Their mother dies and her tomb is built on the small land which they own until the zamindar tells them that it is his land, since their mother had taken a loan from the man. Indra volunteers to work day and night, to pay off the loan as long as they don't tear down his mother's tomb. The Zamindar agrees and the local station master helps them. Slowly Indra and Puja grow up. One day, Barsha, Puja's best friend, comes to their house to invite Puja to their house as she is getting married. Barsha's elder brother Rahul also arrives on the same day from UK, finishing his studies.
Slowly Rahul and Puja fall in love but Rahul's father does not bear it as Puja is not as rich as them, and is thus not to their standards; Rahul is also to be married to Rahul's father Shantonu Chowdhury's business partner's daughter, Mona. Shantonu Chowdhury humiliates Puja as well as Indra, who arrives a minute before, and both are thrown of the house after Shantonu Chowdhury accuses them of trying to entice and trap Rahul. When Rahul learns of this, he goes to Puja's house and pleads to her brother to accept him. Indra gives him a chance, just like he was given a chance by the Zamindar when he was little. Rahul is tasked to take care of the cows, clean up after them and grow more crops than Indra by the end of the season; if he does not, Rahul will be thrown out of the village and can never see Puja again. A village boy who was beaten up by Indra earlier, he doesn't bear it. With his goons, Mona's father trying to get Rahul to lose the competition, Rahul has to work hard for his love, eating red chillies and rice everyday, even though he can't bear it. Through many antics from the Village goons side and Mona's side, Rahul eventually proves his love for Puja to Indra, and succeeds in growing more grains. However, the village goon kidnaps Puja and then later tries to rape her. A fight takes place in which Rahul kills the goon, Indra, after realizing that Rahul and Puja should be together, takes the blame for this and spends 5 years in prison. The movie ends with Indra's release from prison which is also when Puja and Rahul get married, in everyone's presence. Shantonu Chowdhury also becomes happy to get Puja as daughter-in-law.

Cast

Dev as Rahul
Payel Sarkar as Pooja
Tapas Paul as Indra, Pooja's elder brother
Arun Bannerjee as Rahul's father
Anuradha Roy as Rahul's mother
Rajatava Dutta as Mona's father
Kamalika Banerjee as Mona's mother
Subhasish Mukherjee as Kartik
Paoli Dam as Barsha
Bharat Kaul as Village goon
Meghna Halder as Mona 
Sumit Ganguly as Shombhu, caretaker of Indra's firm
Joy Badlani as Jailor 
Debu Bose as station master

Soundtrack

Choreography by Naidu.

References

External links

www.telegraphindia.com preview
www.telegraphindia.com preview

2007 films
Films scored by Jeet Ganguly
Films scored by Devi Sri Prasad
2000s Bengali-language films
Bengali-language Indian films
Films directed by Rabi Kinagi
Bengali remakes of Telugu films
Indian romantic comedy films
2007 romantic comedy films